Maribyrnong Park Football Club is an Australian rules football club located 7 km north of  Melbourne in the suburb of Moonee Ponds .
The club was formed in 1980 from an amalgamation of Riverside Stars and Moonee Imperials football clubs who shared the same clubroom and played on adjacent ovals at Maribyrnong Park.The first (captain) coach was Russell Parker, who originally played  at Montmorency Football Club for many years.

2006–2018 
In 2008, Maribyrnong Park made their much anticipated return to A Grade. In only their second season, the Lions defeated Greenvale to break a 26-year drought.

On 13 Sep 2009 the Maribyrnong Park Lions won the EDFL A Grade Grand Final – Maribyrnong Park 102 def Greenvale 84.

In 2010, Maribyrnong Park finished 4th at the end of the home and away season. They went on to defeat 3rd placed Oak Park then 2nd placed Keilor to advance to the Grand Final against Greenvale. On 12 Sep 2010, in a back to back as playing coach, Holland lead the Maribyrnong Park A Grade Seniors team to victory – Maribyrnong Park 90 def Greenvale 73.

Recruited players to the AFL/VFL 

 Rory Atkins – Adelaide Football Club
 Touk Miller – Gold Coast
 Luke Ryan – Fremantle Football Club
 Jack Bytel- St Kilda Saints

Essendon District Football League clubs
1980 establishments in Australia
Australian rules football clubs established in 1980
Sport in the City of Moonee Valley
Australian rules football clubs in Melbourne